The women's individual time trial cycling event at the 2015 European Games in Baku took place over a distance of 25.8 km on 18 June starting and finishing at Bilgah Beach. The course of the race was quite flat and not very technical with a turning point halfway.

Ellen van Dijk from the Netherlands won the time trial with force majeure ahead of Hanna Solovey from Ukraine and Annemiek van Vleuten from the Netherlands.

Race
In the morning of the competition it was sunny with a very strong wind. Because the wind was stronger than the days before, Ellen van Dijk chose another wheel for her bike before the start.

The first rider started at 10:00 with one minute between every rider. For a long time the intermediate and final times of Annemiek van Vleuten from the Netherlands, who started early in the competition, were the fastest times. The intermediate time of Hanna Solovey from Ukraine was seven seconds faster than Van Vleuten. A bit later Ellen van Dijk from the Netherlands, the main favorite who started last, was 14 seconds faster than Solovey. On the finish line the Russian Tatiana Antoshina finished just a few seconds slower than Van Vleuten. Solovey was on the finish about half a minute faster than Van Vleuten and Van Dijk was subsequently half a minute faster than Solovey. Ellen van Dijk was very pleased with her win: "It is the first European Games and that is quite special. This was a race I have been preparing for, for a long time. I have been training at high altitude. I wanted to be very strong in this period and that worked out great. It was very tough today, especially with the wind, but then again it's the same circumstances for everyone. I was able to get into a rhythm quickly and I could keep up the pace. This is what I can do, but it didn't feel particularly great on this course. It's hard to concentrate when it's only one straight road ahead. There's not much to do while riding. You just have to push and push."

Results

References

Women's individual time trial
2015 in women's road cycling